South Peace River was a provincial electoral district in the Canadian province of British Columbia. It was first contested in the general election of 1956 and last contested in the general election of 1986. It and neighbouring North Peace River were formed by the partition of the old Peace River riding. Redistribution in advance of the 1991 election saw South Peace River adjusted and renamed Peace River South.

Notable MLAs

Political geography

History

Election results 

|-

|Co-operative Commonwealth Fed.
|Arthur Roald Dahlen
|align="right"|1,275 		 			
|align="right"|36.24%
|align="right"|
|align="right"|unknown

|Liberal
|Harold John Burton
|align="right"|456 	 		 	
|align="right"|12.96%
|align="right"|
|align="right"|unknown
|- bgcolor="white"
!align="right" colspan=3|Total valid votes
!align="right"|3,518 	 
!align="right"|100.00%
!align="right"|
|- bgcolor="white"
!align="right" colspan=3|Total rejected ballots
!align="right"|49
!align="right"|
!align="right"|
|- bgcolor="white"
!align="right" colspan=3|Turnout
!align="right"|%
!align="right"|
!align="right"|
|}
 	  	  	    	  	   	 

|-

|Co-operative Commonwealth Fed.
|John Close
|align="right"|1,339 	
|align="right"|25.38%
|align="right"|
|align="right"|unknown

|Progressive Conservative
|Peter Runkle
|align="right"|500 	  	 	
|align="right"|9.48% 
|align="right"|
|align="right"|unknown

|Liberal
|Joseph H. Lowes
|align="right"|303 					          
|align="right"|5.74%
|align="right"|
|align="right"|unknown
|- bgcolor="white"
!align="right" colspan=3|Total valid votes
!align="right"|5,275 	
!align="right"|100.00%
!align="right"|
|- bgcolor="white"
!align="right" colspan=3|Total rejected ballots
!align="right"|64
!align="right"|
!align="right"|
|- bgcolor="white"
!align="right" colspan=3|Turnout
!align="right"|%
!align="right"|
!align="right"|
|}
	  	  	 

|-

|Liberal
|William Arthur McClellan
|align="right"|700 	   	 	
|align="right"|14.31%
|align="right"|
|align="right"|unknown
|- bgcolor="white"
!align="right" colspan=3|Total valid votes
!align="right"|4,890 
!align="right"|100.00%
!align="right"|
|- bgcolor="white"
!align="right" colspan=3|Total rejected ballots
!align="right"|54
!align="right"|
!align="right"|
|- bgcolor="white"
!align="right" colspan=3|Turnout
!align="right"|%
!align="right"|
!align="right"|
|}	  	  	  
  	  	  	  	  	   	 

|-

|Liberal
|Vera Daphne Peel Phillips
|align="right"|888 				 	 	
|align="right"|20.54%
|align="right"|
|align="right"|unknown

|- bgcolor="white"
!align="right" colspan=3|Total valid votes
!align="right"|4,324	
!align="right"|100.00%
!align="right"|
|- bgcolor="white"
!align="right" colspan=3|Total rejected ballots
!align="right"|77
!align="right"|
!align="right"|
|- bgcolor="white"
!align="right" colspan=3|Turnout
!align="right"|%
!align="right"|
!align="right"|
|}  	  	  	 
  	   	  	 

|-

|- bgcolor="white"

|Liberal
|Phillip Sydney Sykes
|align="right"|590 	  		 			 	 	
|align="right"|9.72%
|align="right"|
|align="right"|unknown
|- bgcolor="white"
!align="right" colspan=3|Total valid votes
!align="right"|6,067		
!align="right"|100.00%
!align="right"|
|- bgcolor="white"
!align="right" colspan=3|Total rejected ballots
!align="right"|50
!align="right"|
!align="right"|
|- bgcolor="white"
!align="right" colspan=3|Turnout
!align="right"|%
!align="right"|
!align="right"|
|}  	

|-

|Progressive Conservative
|Donald Albert Marshall
|align="right"|2,951 			 		 	
|align="right"|41.97%
|align="right"|
|align="right"|unknown

|Liberal
|Francis James McIntyre
|align="right"|156 			 	 	
|align="right"|2.22%
|align="right"|
|align="right"|unknown
|- bgcolor="white"
!align="right" colspan=3|Total valid votes
!align="right"|7,032 	
!align="right"|100.00%
!align="right"|
|- bgcolor="white"
!align="right" colspan=3|Total rejected ballots
!align="right"|107
!align="right"|
!align="right"|
|- bgcolor="white"
!align="right" colspan=3|Turnout
!align="right"|%
!align="right"|
!align="right"|
|}  		 
  	  	  	  	  	  	 	  	  	  	   	  	 

|-

|Liberal
|James Bailey Henderson
|align="right"|452 	 	 	 	 	 	
|align="right"|6.25%
|align="right"|
|align="right"|unknown
|- bgcolor="white"
!align="right" colspan=3|Total valid votes
!align="right"|7,225 
!align="right"|100.00%
!align="right"|
|- bgcolor="white"
!align="right" colspan=3|Total rejected ballots
!align="right"|58
!align="right"|
!align="right"|
|- bgcolor="white"
!align="right" colspan=3|Turnout
!align="right"|%
!align="right"|
!align="right"|
|} 
	  	 

|-

|- bgcolor="white"
!align="right" colspan=3|Total valid votes
!align="right"|8,054
!align="right"|100.00%
!align="right"|
|- bgcolor="white"
!align="right" colspan=3|Total rejected ballots
!align="right"|123
!align="right"|
!align="right"|
|- bgcolor="white"
!align="right" colspan=3|Turnout
!align="right"|%
!align="right"|
!align="right"|
|} 
  	  	  	  	 

|-

|Liberal
|William George Litwin
|align="right"|257 	 			
|align="right"|2.53%
|align="right"|
|align="right"|unknown
|- bgcolor="white"
!align="right" colspan=3|Total valid votes
!align="right"|10,165 		
!align="right"|100.00%
!align="right"|
|- bgcolor="white"
!align="right" colspan=3|Total rejected ballots
!align="right"|156
!align="right"|
!align="right"|
|- bgcolor="white"
!align="right" colspan=3|Turnout
!align="right"|%
!align="right"|
!align="right"|
|}

|-

|Progressive Conservative
|John Peter Diemert
|align="right"|1,676 		 	 		 	
|align="right"|16.02%
|align="right"|
|align="right"|unknown
|- bgcolor="white"
!align="right" colspan=3|Total valid votes
!align="right"|10,466 	
!align="right"|100.00%
!align="right"|
|- bgcolor="white"
!align="right" colspan=3|Total rejected ballots
!align="right"|163
!align="right"|
!align="right"|
|- bgcolor="white"
!align="right" colspan=3|Turnout
!align="right"|%
!align="right"|
!align="right"|
|}

Sources

Elections BC website - historical election data

Former provincial electoral districts of British Columbia
Peace River Country
Constituencies established in 1956
1956 establishments in British Columbia